The Taperoá River is a river of Paraíba state in northeastern Brazil. It is one of many rivers of Paraíba.

See also
List of rivers of Paraíba

References
Brazilian Ministry of Transport

Rivers of Paraíba